The 500 metres distance for men in the 2009–10 ISU Speed Skating World Cup was contested over 12 races on six occasions, out of a total of seven World Cup occasions for the season, with the first occasion taking place in Berlin, Germany, on 6–8 November 2009, and the final occasion taking place in Heerenveen, Netherlands, on 12–14 March 2010.

Tucker Fredricks of the United States won the cup, while Jan Smeekens of the Netherlands came second, and Mika Poutala of Finland came third. Defending champion Yu Fengtong of China finished in 20th place.

Top three

Race medallists

Final standings
''Standings as of 14 March 2010 (end of the season).

References

Men 0500